Pentecost Ikedinachi Obiechina (born 13 March 1998) is a Nigerian footballer who plays as midfielder for Slovak club Prameň Kováčová.

Career

FK Senica
Obiechina made his Fortuna Liga debut for Senica against Slovan Bratislava on 4 August 2017, playing the entire duration of the 1:1 draw.

Czech Republic
In March 2018, Obiechina revealed on Instagram, that he was playing for Czech club FC Strani. In July 2018, he joined Znojmo. However, after playing two games for the club, he was loaned out to FC Viktoria Otrokovice for the rest of the year, only two months after signing with Znojmo.

Return to Slovakia
In the summer 2019, he returned to Slovakia and signed with Prameň Kováčová playing in the 3. Liga (Central).

References

External links
 FK Senica official club profile
 Futbalnet Profile

1998 births
Living people
Nigerian footballers
Nigerian expatriate footballers
Association football midfielders
FK Inter Bratislava players
FK Senica players
1. SC Znojmo players
ŠK Prameň Kováčová players
Slovak Super Liga players
2. Liga (Slovakia) players
3. Liga (Slovakia) players
Czech National Football League players
Nigerian expatriate sportspeople in Slovakia
Nigerian expatriate sportspeople in the Czech Republic
Expatriate footballers in Slovakia
Expatriate footballers in the Czech Republic
Place of birth missing (living people)